Neo Kgalabi Mothiba (born 21 March 1982) is a South African basketball player with the Tshwane Suns and Egoli Magic of South Africa's Premier Basketball League. He is also a member of the South Africa national basketball team and appeared with the club at the 2005, 2007 and 2009 African Championships as well as the 2006 Commonwealth Games.

References

External links

1982 births
Living people
South African men's basketball players
Soweto Panthers players
Egoli Magic players
Jozi Nuggets players
Sportspeople from Pretoria